North Carolina Highway 903 (NC 903) is a primary state highway in the U.S. state of North Carolina. It serves as predominantly rural highway in the Inner Banks region and arterial road in and around Greenville.

Route description
NC 903 begins at an intersection with NC 411 east of Garland; where it proceeds to first go north, crossing the Black River, and then east through Delway and Magnolia. Northeast of Magnolia, NC 903 connects with I-40 at its exit 373 and begin its first concurrency with NC 24 (one of many concurrences along its route). Traveling along the Kenansville Bypass, a rural expressway, it completely bypasses the city of Kenansville. Reverting to a two-lane rural highway and switching to a concurrency with NC 11 and later NC 111, it continues north, crossing the Neuse River, to US 70 in La Grange. Continuing north, it reaches Snow Hill where it overlaps briefly with NC 58 and with US 13/US 258. Breaking away from the concurrences, it goes east to Maury and then northeast to Winterville, where it meets up with NC 11 again.

As NC 903 enters Greenville, the biggest city along its route, it stays completely on Memorial Drive as various highway routes connect on then off it: NC 43, from Greenville Boulevard to Fifth Street; US 13, joins at Dickinson Avenue; and NC 33, from Greene Street to Belvoir Highway. Halfway through the city, it crosses the Tar River. After passing US 264 in the north Greenville area, NC 903 splits northeasterly from US 13/NC 11 to Stokes and then north to Robersonville which is the first original section of the route. After connecting with US 13 (third and final time) and US 64, NC 903 goes north and merges with NC 125 and travels to Hamilton. Now going in a northwesterly direction, it splits and then reconnects with NC 125 in Scotland Neck, overlapping briefly with US 258 in town. The NC 903/NC 125 concurrency continues to US 301 in Halifax where it finally splits going west towards I-95 and then to US 158, bypassing Roanoke Rapids. Sharing one last concurrency with US 158, it breaks north at Lttleton, going through the Lake Gaston area by first crossing the Roanoke River, travels through the community of Elams, then swings west over Songbird Creek and then finally north into Virginia, where it downgrades to secondary state road 903.

History
In 1938, NC 903 was extended north on new routing from US 64 to NC 125. In 1967 or 1968, NC 903 was extended north, overlapping with NC 125 to Hamilton, then on new primary routing to US 258/NC 125 in Scotland Neck.

Around 1972, NC 903 extended northwest along NC 125 to Halifax, then west on new primary routing to I-95. Between 1976-1978, NC 903 made its first extension south, with an overlap with NC 11 through Greenville and Winterville, then replaced NC 91 south to US 70 in La Grange.

Between 1980-1982, NC 903 was extended west, from I-95, on new primary routing to US 158; it then made its final north extension, between 1984-1990, by overlapping US 158 to Littleton and then through the Lake Gaston area to the Virginia state line, south of Ebony. Also during the late 1980s, NC 903 was extended south on new routing from La Grange to Albertson, then share concurrences with NC 111 and NC 11 to Kenansville, and again new primary routing connecting I-40 and to end at US 117 in Magnolia.

In 1994 or 1995, NC 903 was extended southwest to its current southern terminus with NC 411 east of Garland. In 2002, NC 903 was moved onto the Kenansville Bypass.

Junction list

See also
North Carolina Bicycle Route 4-Concurrent with NC 903 from Eaton Ferry Road to River Road near Lake Gaston
North Carolina Bicycle Route 7-Concurrent with NC 903 from Jenny Lind Road to Rag Road near La Grange

References

External links

NCRoads.com: N.C. 903

903
Transportation in Sampson County, North Carolina
Transportation in Duplin County, North Carolina
Transportation in Lenoir County, North Carolina
Transportation in Greene County, North Carolina
Transportation in Pitt County, North Carolina
Transportation in Martin County, North Carolina
Transportation in Halifax County, North Carolina
Transportation in Warren County, North Carolina